Polsat Sport is a Polish sports channel owned by Polsat.  It launched on 11 August 2000 and is available via satellite on Cyfrowy Polsat.

Polsat Sport HD 
Polsat Sport HD is a sports channel owned by Polsat, which broadcasts in High Definition. It was established in 2008. In its first showing in Poland UEFA European Football Championship (2008) in HD. Polsat Sport HD had own scheduling, combining sports, and stores shown in the other sports channels belonging to the Polsat. Polsat Sport HD have the same programming schedule as Polsat Sport from June 1, 2012.

Programming

Football 
 Fortuna 1 Liga
 Fortuna Puchar Polski
 Polish SuperCup
 Eredivisie
Fortuna:Liga
Coupe de France
Major League Soccer
Scottish Premiership
 UEFA Super Cup
 UEFA Champions League (Polsat Sport Premium channels)
 UEFA Europa League (Polsat Sport Premium channels)
UEFA Youth League
UEFA Women's Champions League (final only)
 UEFA Nations League
Copa América
International Champions Cup

Futsal 

 UEFA Futsal Champions League

E-Sports 
 League of Legends Championship Series

Motorsports 
 MotoGP
 Moto2
 Moto3
 MotoE World Championship
 FIA World Endurance Championship (except for the 24 Hours of Le Mans )

Volleyball 
 FIVB Volleyball Men's World Championship
 FIVB Volleyball Women's World Championship
 Men's European Volleyball Championship
 Women's European Volleyball Championship
 FIVB Volleyball World League
 FIVB Volleyball World Grand Prix
 FIVB Volleyball Men's World Cup
 FIVB Volleyball Women's World Cup
 FIVB Volleyball World Grand Champions Cup
 FIVB Volleyball Men's Club World Championship
 FIVB Volleyball Women's Club World Championship
 Polish Volleyball League
 Polish Women's Volleyball League
 Swatch FIVB World Tour

Tennis 
 Wimbledon Championship

Athletics 
 IAAF Diamond League

American football 
 European League of Football

Boxing 
 Sauerland Events
Premier Boxing Champions

Rugby 

 Rugby World Cup

Logo history

References 
http://www.polsatsport.pl/Wiadomosc/lc/LCS-EU-Na-Antenie-Polsat-Sport-News_1448804/index.html

External links 
Polsat Sport

See also 
 Polsat Sport Extra
 Polsat Sport News

Polsat
Sports television in Poland
Television channels in Poland
Television channels and stations established in 2000